Mykola Viktorovych Lytvyn (born 25 September 1958) is a professional Ukrainian football coach and former player.

Honours

As Player 
Bukovina Chernovtsy
Soviet Second League: 1990

Khimik Zhytomyr
Ukrainian Second League: 1992–93

As Coach 
Lehenda-ShVSM Chernihiv
 Ukrainian Women's League 2002, 2005, 
 Women's Cup 2002, 2005

References

External links

 The most famous of Litvins (Найвідоміший з Литвинів). Kiev Oblast Football Federation. 1 July 2016
 Mykola Lytvyn: Female football taught me to work (Николай ЛИТВИН: «Женский футбол научил м;еня работать»). Sport.ua. 9 October 2014

1963 births
Living people
Soviet footballers
Ukrainian footballers
Association football defenders
Ukrainian expatriate footballers
Expatriate footballers in Belarus
Ukrainian Premier League players
Belarusian Premier League players
FC Desna Chernihiv players
SC Tavriya Simferopol players
FC Polissya Zhytomyr players
FC Bukovyna Chernivtsi players
FC Nyva Vinnytsia players
SC Korosten players
FC Rechitsa-2014 players
FC Ros Bila Tserkva players
Ukrainian football managers
WFC Lehenda-ShVSM Chernihiv managers
FC Arsenal Bila Tserkva managers
Ukraine women's national football team managers
Female association football managers
Sportspeople from Kyiv Oblast